"Trump: The Rusical" is the fourth episode of the eleventh season of the American reality competition television series RuPaul's Drag Race, which aired on VH1 on March 21, 2019. The episode has contestants deliver Rachel Maddow impressions for the mini challenge, and perform a musical parody of Grease about Donald Trump and the women in his life and cabinet for the main challenge. The musical features choreography by Yanis Marshall, and sees Donald Trump portrayed by former contestant Ginger Minj. Maddow appears as a special guest; Joel McHale and Tiffany Pollard serve as guest judges, alongside regular panelists RuPaul, Michelle Visage, and Ross Mathews.

Episode

Mini challenge

For the mini challenge ("Why You Maddow, Tho?"), contestants get into "quick drag" and deliver the news while impersonating Rachel Maddow, RuPaul's favorite television anchor. Maddow appears as a special guest and helps introduce the mini challenge. Contestants read fictional news from a teleprompter, some more successfully than others. RuPaul names Scarlet Envy the winner.

Main challenge
For the main challenge ("Trump: The Rusical"), contestants perform a lip sync musical parody of Grease (1971) about U.S. President Donald Trump and the women in his life and cabinet. The musical features choreography by Yanis Marshall, who provides instruction during the episode. As the winner of the mini challenge, Scarlet Envy assigns the following roles:

 A'keria Davenport as Stormy Daniels
 Ariel Versace as Shandy (based on Sandy from Grease)
 Brooke Lynn Hytes as Ivana Trump
 Mercedes Iman Diamond as Ivanka Trump
 Nina West as Sarah Sanders
 Plastique Tiara as Melania Trump
 Ra'Jah O'Hara as Omarosa Manigault Newman
 Scarlet Envy as Betsy DeVos
 Shuga Cain as Hillary Clinton
 Silky Nutmeg Ganache as Oprah Winfrey
 Vanessa Vanjie Mateo as Rosie O'Donnell
 Yvie Oddly as Kellyanne Conway

During preparations for the main challenge, Yvie Oddly reveals she has Ehlers–Danlos syndrome, type 3, a connective tissue disease, Nina West describes being harassed during college in the wake of the murder of Matthew Shepard, and Mercedes Iman Diamond (the first Muslim contestant on the show) addresses Islamophobia and explains her previous reluctance to discuss her religion on the show. Silky Nutmeg Ganache also explains she is a registered Republican because of party gerrymandering and "gentrification and movement of the districts". She explains, "It's very important that people realize that if you want to stop that within the political process, get smarter than them. Register as a Republican, and they'll have to redo everything."

The musical features former contestant Ginger Minj as Donald Trump. Ross Matthews also participates by interjecting a line from the judges panel at Ra'Jah O'Hara as Newman; Mathews and Newman competed on the first season of Celebrity Big Brother, a spin-off of the American reality television series Big Brother.

Runway

RuPaul introduces guest judges Joel McHale and Tiffany Pollard, and reveals the theme for the runway: "Orange Alert". Most contestants wear orange-colored outfits. Shuga Cain's look is a parody of Trump. Her outfit is blue and resembles a business suit, but her face is colored orange. She eats Cheetos while walking the runway, rubs some of the Cheetos residue on her face, and gestures a "pussy grab", alluding to the Donald Trump Access Hollywood tape.

Scarlet Envy, Nina West, Ariel Versace, Plastique Tiara, Shuga Cain, and A'Keria C. Davenport are declared safe. RuPaul tells Scarlet she did a good job casting for the musical. Yvie Oddly, Silky Nutmeg Ganache, and Brooke Lynn Hytes receive positive feedback from the judges, while Ra'Jah O'Hara, Mercedes Iman Diamond, and Vanessa Vanjie Mateo receive negative critiques for their lack of performance in the musical. RuPaul names Silky Nutmeg Ganache the winner of the challenge. Mercedes Iman Diamond and Ra'Jah O'Hara are deemed the bottom two and lip sync battle to James Brown's "Living in America". RuPaul declares Ra'Jah O'Hara the winner of the lip sync battle, eliminating Mercedes Iman Diamond from the competition. Mercedes Iman Diamond ululates as she exits the stage.

Reception
Reception of the episode has been mixed. Bianca Guzzo of IN Magazine praised the episode, writing: "Honestly, this was one of the most entertaining Rusicals in the show's history. It beautifully combined political humour, with the essence of Grease, and Ginger Minj as Trump… what else could you want?" Contrastingly, Joey Guerra of the Houston Chronicle said, "...aside from a Ginger Minj cameo as Trump, everyone else here is pretty BLAH. The musical just isn't very funny. It could have been some sort of bold political satire, but it falls flat and doesn't even go for easy jokes." PinkNews Charlie Jones was similarly critical, who wrote, "Drag Race deserves its dues for setting up camp in the middle of a minefield, but let’s not pretend it didn't get maimed. It also, however, produced some of the most inspiring, and horrifying, personal narratives seen on reality TV."

Matt Rogers of Vulture.com said of the mini challenge, "I don't know whether Ru is an extra big fan of Maddow, or vice versa, but this challenge feels emblematic of what's off about the show right now. Maybe it's that it feels like it exists in an ultraprivileged bubble. Maybe it's the celebrity cameo that feels very 'we were able to do this and so we did, and we even focused a whole challenge around it.' Something specifically about Maddow's inclusion just made me roll my eyes."

See also
 Cultural depictions of Ivanka Trump
 Cultural depictions of Melania Trump
 Islamophobia in the United States
 List of Rusicals

References

External links
 Trump: The Rusical  at VH1
  (March 21, 2019), VH1
  (March 21, 2019), VH1
  (March 22, 2019), VH1

2019 American television episodes
American LGBT-related television episodes
Cultural depictions of Donald Trump
Cultural depictions of Hillary Clinton
Parodies of Donald Trump
RuPaul's Drag Race episodes
Works about Donald Trump